Roy Kift (born 30 January 1943 in Bideford, Devon) is an English writer.

Life 
Roy Kift read French and Romance studies at the University of Wales in Aberystwyth, graduating with a BA in 1964. Between 1965 and 1968 he followed an acting course at the Drama Centre London. This was followed by acting seasons in Sheffield, Newcastle, London and Amsterdam. Since 1970 he has devoted his life mainly to writing and translating theatre plays and other texts, with a few excursions in directing and acting. His works include theatre plays, travel guides and children's books. He translates from French, German and Italian into English. Amongst the best-known authors he has translated are Molière, Goldoni, Patrick Süskind and Heinar Kipphardt. Roy Kift contributes regular articles and criticism to the New York theatre magazine "Western European Stages".
Roy Kift was married to the social historian Dagmar Kift and has two daughters. He currently lives in the state of North Rhine Westphalia, Germany.

Prizes and awards 
 1962 1st Prize University of Wales Eisteddfod playwriting competition for And Betty Martin…
 1974 Thames Television Theatre Prize for Downers
 1981 Winner. Preis der Bundesarbeitsgemeinschaft "Hilfe für Behinderte" for Stärker als Superman
 1984 Winner Competition organised by the Württembergische Staatstheater, Stuttgart, for Joy (Opera libretto. Composer: Susanne Erding)
 1985 Literary award from the City of Berlin
 1987 as a radio director: Radio Play of the Year: Howard Barker's Scenes from an Execution Radio Bremen/SWF/RIAS Berlin.
 2013 1st prize XXIV International Theatre Festival "Bez Granic" for "Camp Comedy" (KOMEDIA OBOZOWA)

Works (selection)

Theatre plays 
 1962: And Betty Martin…. (1st Prize University of Wales Eisteddfod)
 1968: The Continuing Tale of the Supermale. Sheffield Playhouse
 1970: Mary Mary. Royal Court Theatre Upstairs, later European tour incl. Amsterdam and Zurich. La Mama Theater, New York
 1971:	Genesis. Freehold Theatre, London
 1974:	Downers. Bradford University
 1976: The Complete Whole Earth Catalogue. Royal Shakespeare Company, Donmar Theatre, London
 1976: Smile for Jesus and the Cameraman. ICA London
 1976: Cakewalk. Hampstead Theatre, London
 1977: Happy and Glorious. (co-author Patrick Barlow), Almost Free Theatre, London
 1978: Land of Hope and Glory. (co-author Patrick Barlow) Theatre Royal Stratford East
 1980: Stärker als Superman. World Premiere: GRIPS Theatre, Berlin
 1981: Stronger than Superman. Unicorn Theatre, London (translated into 21 languages)
 1984: Joy, Opera libretto. Composer: Susanne Erding. World premiere. Kiel Opera House, Germany
 1992: Dreams of Beating Time. Holocaust play on Wilhelm Furtwängler and his former colleagues in the Theresienstadt concentration camp
 1999: Camp Comedy. (Holocaust play about Kurt Gerron and the cabaret in the Theresienstadt concentration camp. Published by the University of Wisconsin Press. Translations: German, Polish, French. World amateur premiere, CUNY GENESEO 2003, directed by Randy Kaplan. World professional premiere, Legnica, Poland, September 2012) The production was invited to the prestigious Warsaw Theatre Meeting in April 2013 and was later awarded the Grand Prix at the XXIV "Bez Granic" International Theatre Festival in Cieszyn (Poland/Czech Republic).
 2005: Cathedral of Heresies. S. Fischer Verlag (On problems in the Roman Catholic Church)
 2010: Nothing. Stage adaptation of Janne Teller’s novel for young people. (Strident Press, GB)
 2011: The True Story of Adam and Eve as personally dictated by God Almighty, the Creator of Heaven and Earth to his prophet Moses between 2.41 pm on the 28th May and 9.27 am on 3 June 1423 BC and later published in a condensed version in the Book of Genesis for the salvation of humanity. (A three-person comedy debunking the GENESIS myth as a man-made fiction to justify an authoritarian, male-dominated world. German and English versions.)
 2011: The Day God went on Facebook, a satirical comedy in 2 Acts.(also available in German and Polish)
 2013: One, Two, Free, a play for two persons about the performance of Verdi's Requiem in the Theresienstadt Ghetto in 1944.
 2015: Eden's Garden, a play about Britain's refusal to help the Jews in Poland during the Second World War
 2019: The Clearing, a dramatic parable about consumer terror, climate change and human cruelty. 3 actors.

TV plays 
Several TV plays for the BBC, Thames Television and Granada Television.

Theatre translations 
From French:
 Molière's Don Juan
 Molière's Monsieur de Pourceaugnac (for the BBC)

From Italian:
 Goldoni's Mirandolina. BBC
 Gozzi's King Stag (Il Re Cervo). Arts Theatre, London

From German:
 Volker Ludwig's Things that go Bump in the Night. Unicorn Theatre, London
 Volker Ludwig's Mr Robinsons’ Party. Tricycle theatre, London
 Volker Ludwig's All in Stitches. Richmond Theatre
 Rainer Hachfeld's Mugnog Kids. Unicorn Theatre
 Reiner Hachfeld's The Magic Granddad. Unicorn Theatre
 Patrick Süskind's Der Kontrabaß (The Double Bass). National Theatre, London (at Edinburgh Festival)
 Heinar Kipphardt's Brother Eichmann. (Library Theatre, Manchester)

Other translations (selection):
Books:
 Dagmar Kift's The Victorian Music Hall. Cambridge University Press
 FIFA: 100 Years of Football. Weidenfeld & Nicolson, London.
 Magic Places. (English edition of the catalogue for the exhibition „Magische Orte" in Germany 2011)

Children’s book 
 Franz, Anna und die Zechengeister. Klartext Verlag, Essen 1997, 

Travel guides 
 Tour the Ruhr. 4th edition, Klartext Verlag, Essen 2011, 
 The Wupper Valley. Wuppertal, Solingen, Remscheid and the Bergisch Land. Klartext Verlag, Essen 2005, 
 Düsseldorf, Aachen and the Lower Rhine. Klartext Verlag, Essen 2008, 
 The Complete Ruhrgebiet Klartext Verlag, Essen,2018.

Teaching activities 
Roy Kift has lectured and taught at institutions like Tel-Aviv University, Glasgow University, the City University of New York (CUNY)in Geneseo, the Institut Francaise in London, Drama Centre London, the Fritz-Kirchhoff Theaterschule in Berlin, and the University of Cambridge (GB).

Articles and lectures on theatre 
 "Getting to Grips with children’s theatre". In: Theatre Quarterly, Vol X, no 39. 1981
 Hoping for the Unexpected: The Theatre of Peter Zadek. In: New Theatre Quarterly, Vol. 1, 1985
 Illusion and Reality in the Theresienstadt Concentration Camp. In: New Theatre Quarterly, Vol 12, 1996
 Reality and Illusion in the Theresienstadt Cabaret. In: Claude Schumacher (ed.): Staging the Holocaust. The Shoah in drama and performance .Cambridge University Press, Cambridge et al. 1998, pp. 147–168
 Singing in the Face of Death. A Study of Jewish Cabaret and Opera during the Holocaust. In: Rebecca Rovit/Alvin Goldberg (eds.): Theatrical Performance in the Holocaust. Texts, Documents, Memoirs. Johns Hopkins University Press, Baltimore et al. 1999, pp. 125–132

Film work 
 1984: ARD. Director: Unter deutschen Dächern. Teure Freunde (a film on the English occupying force in West Berlin)
 2006: Narrator in Ilona Ziok's documentary film Kurt Gerrons Karussell (with Ben Becker, Ute Lemper and others)
 2015: "The Cabaret of Death" (a Polish documentary film about Jewish humour in the holocaust: director Andzej Celinski), Gold Medal New York Arts Festival 2015. Prix Italia, 2015

References

External links 
 Roy Kift's official web site

1943 births
Living people
British writers